Mohrsville is a census-designated place in Centre Township, Berks County, Pennsylvania, United States.  It is located approximately three miles south of the borough of Shoemakersville, along the Schuylkill River.  As of the 2010 census, the population was 383 residents.

Demographics

Former train station
The SEPTA Pottsville Line once served Mohrsville. The service ceased in 1981 after all diesel services were cancelled.

References

External links

Census-designated places in Berks County, Pennsylvania
Census-designated places in Pennsylvania